The Buick Indy V6 engine is a powerful turbocharged, V-6, Indy car racing internal combustion engine, designed and produced by Buick for use in the C.A.R.T. PPG Indy Car World Series, and later the IRL IndyCar Series; between 1982 and 1997. It shares the same architecture, and mechanical design, and is based on the Buick V6 road car engine. A slightly destroked 3.0-liter V6 engine was also used in the March 85G and March 86G IMSA GTP sports prototypes.

Applications

Indy Cars
March 82C
March 83C
March 84C
March 85C
March 86C
March 87C
March 88C
Lola T89/00
Lola T90/00
Lola T91/00
Lola T92/00
Lola T93/00
Lola T95/00

IMSA GTP/Group C sports prototypes
Alba AR3-001
March 85G
March 86G
Alba AR8-001
Alba AR9-001
Alba AR20-01

References

Engines by model
Gasoline engines by model
Buick engines
IndyCar Series
V6 engines